Cherrie Sherrard (born Cherrie Mae Parish on August 25, 1938 in Dallas, Texas) is a track and field athlete from the United States.

She is the mother of American footballer Mike Sherrard.

External links 
 Profile at trackfield.brinkster.net
 
 

1938 births
Living people
American female hurdlers
Athletes (track and field) at the 1967 Pan American Games
Athletes (track and field) at the 1964 Summer Olympics
Olympic track and field athletes of the United States
Track and field athletes from Dallas
Pan American Games gold medalists for the United States
Pan American Games medalists in athletics (track and field)
Medalists at the 1967 Pan American Games
21st-century American women
20th-century American women